Rommersheim is a Stadtteil (quarter) of the town Wörrstadt in Rheinhessen in the German state Rheinland-Pfalz. It lies in a valley south-west of Wörrstadt.

History 
Originally, Rommersheim was called Eichloch. Eichloch is documented the first time 824.
January 15, 1931 the village Eichloch has been renamed Rommersheim, after a supposed abandoned nearby village.
November 7, 1970  Rommersheim with then 432 inhabitants became a suburb of Wörrstadt.

Culture and places of interest 
The Nachrichtliches Verzeichnis der Kulturdenkmäler Rheinland-Pfalz für den Landkreis Alzey-Worms of Generaldirektion Kulturelles Erbe list in particular the following heritage sites in Rommersheim

Buildings 
 Am Rathaus 4: Protestant Church (Rommersheim), built between 1733 and 1751
 Am Rathaus 2: former town hall, around 1600, modifications 18th century
 Hauptstraße 11: Hakenhof; baroque studwork building, around 1700
 Hauptstraße 23: baroque half-timbered building, 18th century
 Mittelgasse 1: half-timbered house, 1584, with half-timbered barn of 1664

Places of interest outside the village 
 "Eichlocher Feldkreuz", Auf dem Somborn (township): late gothic; three border stones, 1613
 former Jewish cemetery (heritage site): nine grave stones, 1868 to 1909

Infrastructure

Public facilities 
The  Neubornschwimmbad is an open air public swimming pool, located between Rommersheim and Wörrstadt.

External links 

 Zur Geschichte von Rommersheim (Rummersheim), früher Eichloch on regionalgeschichte.net
 Rommersheim – Ein Weindorf in Rheinhessen. Im Jahr 2004 wurde es 1180 Jahre alt
 Rommersheim – Ein Ortsporträt von Hermann Götz SWR Fernsehen, Landesschau Rheinland-Pfalz of  May 16, 2009 (incl. film)
 Private Homepage of Rommersheim/Rheinhessen
 History of the Jewish community in Rommersheim
 coat of arms of Rommersheim

References 

Alzey-Worms